Dhikrullah (also spelled Zikrullah) is an Arabic given name built on the words Dhikr and Allah, meaning Remembrance of Allah.

Notable bearers
 Dhikru'llah Khadem (1904–1986), Iranian Hand of the Cause Bahá'í

Arabic masculine given names
Iranian masculine given names